"Explode" is the fourth single to be released by Barbados-based pop group Cover Drive. The song was released on 26 August 2012 as a digital download in the United Kingdom, taken from their debut studio album, Bajan Style. The single version of the track has been remixed to feature vocals from British grime rapper Dappy.

Music video 
A music video to accompany the release of "Explode" was first released on YouTube on 23 July 2012 at a total length of three minutes and fifty-four seconds. The video features the band performing the track in a club, while Dappy sits in the audience watching the performance.

Track listing

Chart performance

Release history

References 

2012 singles
Cover Drive songs
Reggae fusion songs
Polydor Records singles
Song recordings produced by Steve Mac
Songs written by Steve Mac
2012 songs
Songs written by Dappy